Mistral is a studio album by jazz trumpeter Freddie Hubbard that was released by Eastworld and Liberty with Phil Ranelin, Art Pepper, George Cables, Peter Wolf, Roland Bautista, Stanley Clarke, Peter Erskine, and Paulinho da Costa.

Reception
Scott Yanow of Allmusic gave the album two stars and stated, "Compared to his live performances, this studio recording is a disappointment. Altoist Art Pepper and keyboardist George Cables have a few spots but the arrangements are a bit commercial, the originals (three by trumpeter Freddie Hubbard and one apiece from Cables and bassist Stanley Clarke) are forgettable and no one sounds like they are sweating. This LP is one of Hubbard's lesser efforts."

Track listing

All compositions by Freddie Hubbard except as indicated

 "Sunshine Lady" (Stanley Clarke) - 7:18
 "Eclipse" - 7:08
 "Blue Nights" (George Cables) - 7:17
 "Now I've Found Love" - 6:53
 "I Love You" (Cole Porter) - 7:27
 "Bring It Back Home" - 7:55

 Recorded September 15, 17, 18 & 19, 1980 at Ocean Way Recording, Hollywood, CA

Personnel 
Freddie Hubbard - trumpet, flugelhorn
Phil Ranelin - trombone
Art Pepper - alto saxophone
George Cables - piano, electric piano
Peter Wolf - synthesizer
Roland Bautista - guitar
Stanley Clarke - bass, electric bass
Peter Erskine - drums
Paulinho da Costa - percussion

References

1980 albums
Liberty Records albums
Freddie Hubbard albums